José Carlos Becerra (21 May 1936 – 27 May 1970) was a Mexican poet from Villahermosa, Tabasco. He was one of only two people from Tabasco to receive a Guggenheim Fellowship. While traveling in Europe, he was killed in a car accident near Brindisi, Italy, age 34.

References

1936 births
1970 deaths
People from Villahermosa
20th-century Mexican poets
20th-century Mexican male writers
Mexican male poets
Writers from Tabasco
Road incident deaths in Italy